Sun Wah may refer to:

Sun Wah BBQ, a restaurant in Chicago
Sunwah - PearL Linux
Sunwah Linux (rays Linux Distribution)
UniHan IME